Lakewood Suburban Centre is a mixed-development neighbourhood located in southeast Saskatoon, Saskatchewan, Canada. It is a classified as a "suburban centre" subdivision, composed of mostly medium to high-density multiple-unit dwellings, commercial areas and civic facilities. As of 2011, the area is home to 1,850 residents. The neighbourhood is considered a middle-income area, with an average family income of $65,927, an average dwelling value of $227,522 and a home ownership rate of 76.8%.

History
The land for the Lakewood Suburban Centre was annexed between 1975 and 1984. Residential construction began in 2003 after infrastructure had been completed. The housing stock is composed entirely of low-rise apartment style condominiums and townhouses. City council approved architectural controls for some of Lakewood SC's development in 2006. All the lots in the neighbourhood have been purchased, so development will continue until full build-out is achieved.

When Lakewood Suburban Centre first appeared on city maps in the 1980s it had different boundaries further to the west, encompassing the Heritage subdivision, including the area recreation centre and library, as well as the Wildwood Golf Course. In the 1990s, the City of Saskatoon revised its community boundaries, extending the boundary of the Wildwood neighbourhood east to Boychuk Drive, encompassing the land previously defined as being the Lakewood Suburban Centre. Lakewood Suburban Centre was subsequently redefined as the region to the southeast of Boychuk Dr. and Taylor Street.

Government and politics

Lakewood SC exists within the federal electoral district of Saskatoon—Grasswood. It is currently represented by Kevin Waugh of the Conservative Party of Canada, first elected in 2015.

Provincially, the area is within the constituency of Saskatoon Southeast. It is currently represented by Don Morgan of the Saskatchewan Party, first elected in 2003 and re-elected in 2007, 2011 and 2016.

In Saskatoon's non-partisan municipal politics, Lakewood SC lies within ward 9. It is currently represented by Councillor Bev Dubois, first elected in 2016.

Institutions

Education
There are no schools in Lakewood SC. The nearest schools are in the neighbouring Lakeridge subdivision.

Public safety
Fire Station #8 - opened on October 22, 2010. Built to serve the growing population in the southeast part of Saskatoon, construction officially began on Fire Station #8 on August 17, 2009. It cost $5.4 million to build.

Parks and recreation

 Trounce Pond (8.7 acres)
 Southeast Park (proposed, 200 acres)

Commercial
Lakewood SC has commercial development concentrated around the corner of Herold Road and Slimmon Road, with a combination of strip mall and stand-alone commercial buildings. Further commercial development is under way in the southeast corner of Rosewood, which will eventually be accessible via Taylor Street when it is extended further to the east at a later date.

Location
Lakewood Suburban Centre is located within the Lakewood Suburban Development Area.  It is bounded by Boychuk Drive to the west, and Taylor Street to the north. The south and east boundaries are formed by the new neighbourhood of Rosewood.

References

External links

Lakewood SC neighbourhood profile

Neighbourhoods in Saskatoon